The 2016–17 Northern Colorado Bears women's basketball team represented the University of Northern Colorado during the 2016–17 NCAA Division I women's basketball season. The Bears were led by third year head coach Kamie Ethridge and played their home games at the Bank of Colorado Arena. They finished the season 22–8, 14–4 in Big Sky play to finish in third place. They advanced to the quarterfinals of the Big Sky women's tournament where they lost to Idaho State. Despite having 22 wins and a better record, they were not invited to a postseason tournament.

Roster

Schedule

|-
!colspan=9 style="background:#000066; color:#FFCC33;"| Exhibition

|-
!colspan=9 style="background:#000066; color:#FFCC33;"| Non-conference regular season

|-
!colspan=9 style="background:#000066; color:#FFCC33;"| Big Sky regular season

|-
!colspan=9 style="background:#000066; color:#FFCC33;"| Big Sky Women's Tournament

Rankings
2016–17 NCAA Division I women's basketball rankings

See also
 2016–17 Northern Colorado Bears men's basketball team

References

Northern Colorado
Northern Colorado Bears women's basketball seasons
Northern Colorado Bears women's basketball
Northern Colorado Bears women's basketball